The 1956 All-Ireland Senior Camogie Championship was the high point of the 1956 season in Camogie. The championship was won by Antrim who defeated Cork by a four-point margin in the final, having created a major surprise by defeating serial champions Dublin in the semi-final,  and interrupting what would otherwise have been a run of 19 championships in a row by Dublin. The championship featured what were reportedly two of the best camogie matches in the history of the game in its 12-a-side phase, the final and the semi-final between Antrim and Dublin.

Structure
Mayo refused to play Cork in the All-Ireland semi-final because of concerns about the polio outbreak there. The semi-final between Dublin and Antrim prevented a run of 19 Al Ireland finals in succession for Dublin. Maeve Gilroy scored 2-2 and Grace Connolly two goals, Mairead Rainey and Marian Kearns a goal each in Antrim’s 6-2 to 6-1 victory. The Irish News described it as 
“what was generally voted the greatest camogie game ever played in Ulster. The game was characterised by spates of clever play on both side, with Dublin on the whole the more finished in accurate ground and overhead stickwork. At the three quarter stage they led 5-0 to 4-2 only to fall two points behind when Antrim scored their fifth goal. Dublin however regained the lead with their sixth goal a few minutes later. In a great rally, amid tense excitement, the Ulster champions fought back with great determination for Ita O'Reilly to place Marian Kearns, who crashed home what proved to the match winning goal with a magnificent cross-shot, which caught the Dublin defence out of position and their goalkeeper unsighted.

Final
Teresa Kearns, the 14-year-old Antrim goalkeeper from Cloughmills, made a huge contribution to victory, stopping an array of shots from the Cork attack, including a memorable save from Noreen Duggan. Mitchel Cogley wrote in the Irish Independent 
The youngest player on the field made probably the most significant contribution to Antrim’s victory. This was the 14-tyear-old Theresa Kearns, who with Antrim leading 4-3 to 4-2 and Cork pressing desperately, brought off a save from star Cork forward Noreen Duggan which equaled that of Art Foley from Christy Ring the previous week. The parallel went further for, from this escape, Antrim swept away for their fifth goal, which lcinched the issue and brought the title up north. There was nothing between two teams in fleetness of foot, skilful stickwork and length of striking, but Antrim’s defence was the sounder under heavy pressure and the positional play of the forwards was better than that of the Cork girls.

Final stages

 
MATCH RULES
50 minutes
Replay if scores level
Maximum of 3 substitutions

See also
 All-Ireland Senior Hurling Championship
 Wikipedia List of Camogie players
 National Camogie League
 Camogie All Stars Awards
 Ashbourne Cup

References

External links
 Camogie Association
 Historical reports of All Ireland finals
 All-Ireland Senior Camogie Championship: Roll of Honour
 Camogie on facebook
 Camogie on GAA Oral History Project

All-Ireland Senior Camogie Championship
1956
All-Ireland Senior Camogie Championship